Death of the Sun is the fifth album by Cul de Sac, released on February 18, 2003 through Strange Attractors Audio House.

Track listing

Personnel 
Robin Amos – synthesizers, sampler, production, engineering
Colin Decker – mastering
Glenn Jones – acoustic guitar, bass guitar, electric sitar, production, engineering
Jonathan LaMaster – double bass, natural horn, violin
Jon Proudman – drums
Jake Trussell – melodica, toy piano, sampler, production, engineering, photography

References 

2003 albums
Cul de Sac (band) albums